Grandelius is a Swedish surname. Notable people with the surname include:

Nils Grandelius (born 1993), Swedish chess grandmaster
Sonny Grandelius (1929–2008), American football player and coach

Swedish-language surnames